Camporgiano is a comune (municipality) in the Province of Lucca in the Italian region Tuscany, located about  northwest of Florence and about  northwest of Lucca.

Camporgiano borders the following municipalities: Careggine, Castelnuovo di Garfagnana, Piazza al Serchio, San Romano in Garfagnana, Vagli Sotto.

References

External links

 Official website

Cities and towns in Tuscany